The 538th Fighter-Interceptor Squadron is a discontinued unit of the United States Air Force. It was last assigned to the Spokane Air Defense Sector at Larson Air Force Base, Washington, in mid-1960.

The squadron was first activated during World War II as the 538th Fighter Squadron.  It briefly served as a Republic P-47 Thunderbolt replacement unit before being disbanded in a major reorganization of Army Air Forces training units in the spring of 1944.  The squadron was again activated in 1955 as an interceptor unit of Air Defense Command, defending the northwestern United States.  It was inactivated in 1960, when the Air Force transferred its Lockheed F-104 Starfighters to the Air National Guard.

History

World War II

The squadron was first activated by I Fighter Command in October 1943 at Westover Field, Massachusetts as one of the three original squadrons of the 402d Fighter Group.  Less than two weeks later, the squadron moved with its group headquarters to Seymour Johnson Field, North Carolina.  At Seymour Johnson, the 538th and 539th Fighter Squadrons of the 402d Group were reassigned to the 326th Fighter Group, which transferred two of its squadrons to the 402d.

The 326th Group was a Replacement Training Unit for Republic P-47 Thunderbolt pilots.  Replacement Training Units were oversized units that trained individual pilots.  Like most such units, the 326th prepared to conduct a split operation and the 538th and 539th Squadrons moved to Bluethenthal Field, North Carolina, while group headquarters and its other two squadrons remained at Seymour Johnson.  The squadron finally received its Thunderbolts in early 1944 and began operations.  However, the Army Air Forces was finding that standard military units, based on relatively inflexible tables of organization, were not proving to be well adapted to the training mission.  Accordingly, it adopted a more functional system in which each base was organized into a separate numbered unit.  The 538th was disbanded and its mission, personnel and equipment were transferred to the 124th AAF Base Unit (Fighter) and combined with other units at Bluethenthal.

Air Defense

In the summer of 1955 Air Defense Command (ADC) implemented Project Arrow, which was designed to bring back on the active list the fighter units which had compiled memorable records in the two world wars. Project Arrow also reunited fighter squadrons with their traditional headquarters.   As a result, the 323d Fighter-Interceptor Squadron at Larson Air Force Base, Washington moved to Truax Field, Wisconsin to joint the 327th Fighter Group there.  The 538th was reconstituted as the 538th Fighter-Interceptor Squadron and activated at Larson to take over the mission, personnel and equipment of the departing 323d Squadron.

The squadron also took over the 323d's radar equipped and Mighty Mouse rocket armed North American F-86D Sabres.  By the fall of 1957, the 538th had re-equipped with the F-86L Sabre, which was equipped with data link for interception control through the Semi-Automatic Ground Environment (SAGE) system. Squadron experience with the F-86L was short-lived however, as the squadron began transition into the Lockheed F-104A Starfighter about June 1958.

The 538th was the fourth ADC squadron to equip with the Starfighter.  The squadron also received the two-seat, dual-control, combat trainer F-104B. The performance of the F-104B was almost identical to that of the F-104A, but its smaller internal fuel capacity reduced its effective range considerably.
However, ADC did not believe the F-104A was well suited for service as an interceptor aircraft. Its short range and lack of all-weather capability made it incapable of integrating into the SAGE system.  All ADC F-104As, including those of the 538th, were transferred to the Air National Guard and the squadron was inactivated in July 1960.

Lineage
 Constituted as the  538th Fighter Squadron on 14 September 1943
 Activated on 1 October 1943
 Disbanded on 10 April 1944
 Reconstituted and redesignated 538th Fighter-Interceptor Squadron on 20 June 1955
 Activated on 18 August 1955
 Discontinued on 1 July 1960

Assignments
 402d Fighter Group, 1 October 1943
 326th Fighter Group, 25 November 1943 – 10 April 1944
 9th Air Division, 18 August 1955
 4721st Air Defense Group, 1 December 1956
 4700th Air Defense Wing, 1 May 1959
 Spokane Air Defense Sector, 15 May – 1 July 1960

Stations
 Westover Field, Massachusetts, 1 October 1943
 Seymour Johnson Field, North Carolina, 13 October 1943
 Bluethenthal Field, North Carolina, 8 December 1943 – 10 April 1944
 Larson Air Force Base, Washington, 18 August 1955 – 1 July 1960

Aircraft
 Republic P-47 Thunderbolt, 1944
 North American F-86D Sabre, 1955–1957
 North American F-86L Sabre, 1957-1958
 Lockheed F-104A Starfighter, 1958–1960
 Lockheed F-104B Starfighter, 1958–1960

Award

See also

 Aerospace Defense Command Fighter Squadrons
 List of F-86 Sabre units
 List of F-104 Starfighter operators

References

Notes

 Explanatory notes

 Citations

Bibliography

 Buss, Lydus H.(ed), Sturm, Thomas A., Volan, Denys, and McMullen, Richard F., History of Continental Air Defense Command and Air Defense Command July to December 1955, Directorate of Historical Services, Air Defense Command, Ent AFB, CO, (1956)
 
 
 
 
 
 McMullen, Richard F. (1964) The Fighter Interceptor Force 1962-1964, ADC Historical Study No. 27 (Confidential, declassified 22 March 2000)

External links

Fighter squadrons of the United States Air Force
Aerospace Defense Command units